Kagyu Shenpen Kunchab (KSK) is a Tibetan Buddhist center of the Kagyu School located in Santa Fe, New Mexico. The primary practice of the temple is that of Avalokiteśvara, the bodhisattva of compassion. The popular Tibetan female bodhisattva Tara is also honored.

Kagyu Shenpen Kunchab was founded in 1975 by Tibetan lama Karma Dorje, who was sent to establish a Buddhist center by his teacher, Kalu Rinpoche.

Kagyu Shenpen Kunchab Bodhi Stupa
The Kagyu Shenpen Kunchab Bodhi Stupa stands  in height with a  bronze spire.
Lama Karma Dorje started building the stupa in 1983 together with local practitioners. The stupa was finished in 1986 and was consecrated by H.E. Kalu Rinpoche.

The stupa contains Buddhist relics and the interior is brightly painted with Buddhist deities.

See also

Buddhism in the United States
List of Buddhist temples

References

Notes

Works cited

Further reading

External links

1975 establishments in New Mexico
Asian-American culture in New Mexico
Buddhist temples in New Mexico
Kagyu monasteries and temples
Tibetan Buddhism in the United States